Mephitidae is a family of mammals in the order Carnivora, which comprises the skunks and stink badgers. A member of this family is called a mephitid. The skunks of the family are widespread across the Americas, while the stink badgers are in the Greater Sunda Islands of southeast Asia. Species inhabit a variety of habitats, though typically grassland, forest, and shrubland. No estimates have been made for overall population sizes of any of the species, but two species are classified as vulnerable. Mephetids in general are not domesticated, though skunks are sometimes kept as pets.

The twelve species of Mephitidae are split into four genera: the monotypic Conepatus, hog-nosed skunks; Mephitis, skunks; Mydaus, stink badgers; and Spilogale, spotted skunks. Mephitidae was traditionally a clade within the Mustelidae family, with the stink badgers combined with other badgers within the Melinae genus, but more recent genetic evidence resulted in the consensus to separate Mephitidae into its own family. Extinct species have also been placed into all of the extant genera besides Mydaus, as well as 9 extinct genera; 26 extinct Mephitidae species have been found, though due to ongoing research and discoveries the exact number and categorization is not fixed.

Conventions

Conservation status codes listed follow the International Union for Conservation of Nature (IUCN) Red List of Threatened Species. Range maps are provided wherever possible; if a range map is not available, a description of the mephetid's range is provided. Ranges are based on the IUCN Red List for that species unless otherwise noted. All extinct species or subspecies listed alongside extant species went extinct after 1500 CE, and are indicated by a dagger symbol "". Population figures are rounded to the nearest hundred.

Classification
The family Mephitidae consists of twelve extant species belonging to four genera and divided into dozens of extant subspecies. It is not divided into subfamilies. This does not include hybrid species or extinct prehistoric species.

 Genus Conepatus (hog-nosed skunks): four species
 Genus Mephitis (skunks): two species
 Genus Mydaus: (stink badgers): two species
 Genus Spilogale: (spotted skunks): four species

Mephitids
The following classification is based on the taxonomy described by Mammal Species of the World (2005), with augmentation by generally accepted proposals made since using molecular phylogenetic analysis.

Prehistoric mephitids
In addition to extant mephitids, a number of prehistoric species have been discovered and classified as a part of Mephitidae. In addition to being placed within the extant genera Conepatus, Mephitis, and Spilogale, they have been categorized within nine extinct genera. There is no generally accepted classification of extinct mephitid species. The species listed here are based on data from the Paleobiology Database, unless otherwise cited. Where available, the approximate time period the species was extant is given in millions of years before the present (Mya), also based on data from the Paleobiology Database. All listed species are extinct; where a genus or subfamily within Mephitidae comprises only extinct species, it is indicated with a dagger symbol .

 Genus Brachyopsigale (4.9–1.8 Mya)
 B. dubius (4.9–1.8 Mya)
 Genus Brachyprotoma (1.8–0.012 Mya)
 B. obtusata (short-faced skunk) (1.8–0.012 Mya)
 Genus Buisnictis (4.9–1.8 Mya)
 B. breviramus (4.9–1.8 Mya)
 B. burrowsi (4.9–1.8 Mya)
 B. metabatos (4.9–1.8 Mya)
 B. schoffi (4.9–1.8 Mya)
 Genus Conepatus (11 Mya–present)
 C. robustus (0.13–0.012 Mya)
 C. sanmiguelensis (11–5.3 Mya)
 C. suffocans (2.6–0.78 Mya)
 Genus Martinogale
 M. alveodens (11–4.9 Mya)
 M. chisoensis (11–4.9 Mya)
 M. faulli (12–5.3 Mya)
 M. nambiana
 Genus Mephitis
 M. cordubensis
 M. orthrostica
 M. rexroadensis (4.9–1.8 Mya)
 Genus Miomephitis
 M. pilgrimi
 Genus Osmotherium
 O. spelaeum (1.8–0.3 Mya)
 Genus Palaeomephitis 
 P. steinheimensis
 Genus Pliogale (14–4.9 Mya)
 P. furlongi (11–4.9 Mya)
 P. manka (14–10 Mya)
 Genus Promephitis
 P. majori
 P. qinensis
 P. parvus
 Genus Spilogale (4.9 Mya–present)
 S. microdens (4.9–1.8 Mya)
 S. rexroadi (4.9–1.8 Mya)

References

 
Mephitidae
Mephitidae